Winteregg is a railway station on the Bergbahn Lauterbrunnen-Mürren, a hybrid cable car and rail link that connects the villages of Lauterbrunnen and Mürren in the Bernese Oberland region of Switzerland. Winteregg is the point at which trains on the rail link between Lauterbrunnen and Mürren pass.

The station is served by the following passenger trains:

There is also a restaurant at Winteregg and during the winter months a four-man chairlift with a bubble (constructed in 2009 and first used in the 2009–2010 season) takes skiers up the hillside.

References

External links 
Video footage of Winteregg railway station
 

Railway stations in the canton of Bern